Edin Junuzović (born 28 April 1986) is a Croatian footballer who plays for NK Opatija as a forward.

Club career
Junuzović played for Rijeka in the Croatian Prva HNL, Krško in the Slovenian Second League, and Rudar Velenje in the Slovenian PrvaLiga.

In July 2014, Junuzović moved from Kazakhstan Premier League side FC Ordabasy to K League Classic side Gyeongnam FC. On 6 March 2015, Junuzović returned to the Kazakhstan Premier League, signing a one-year contract with FC Kaisar.

Career statistics

Club

References

External links
 

1986 births
Living people
Footballers from Rijeka
Bosniaks of Croatia
Association football forwards
Croatian footballers
HNK Orijent players
HNK Rijeka players
NK Novalja players
NK Krško players
NK Rudar Velenje players
FC Amkar Perm players
FC Dynamo Bryansk players
FC Zhetysu players
FC Ordabasy players
Gyeongnam FC players
FC Kaisar players
Al-Mina'a SC players
Al-Nasr SC (Salalah) players
PFK Nurafshon players
NK Opatija players
Croatian Football League players
Slovenian PrvaLiga players
Russian Premier League players
Russian First League players
Kazakhstan Premier League players
K League 1 players
Iraqi Premier League players
Uzbekistan Super League players
Second Football League (Croatia) players
Croatian expatriate footballers
Expatriate footballers in Slovenia
Expatriate footballers in Russia
Expatriate footballers in Kazakhstan
Expatriate footballers in South Korea
Expatriate footballers in Iraq
Expatriate footballers in Oman
Expatriate footballers in Uzbekistan
Croatian expatriate sportspeople in Slovenia
Croatian expatriate sportspeople in Russia
Croatian expatriate sportspeople in Kazakhstan
Croatian expatriate sportspeople in South Korea
Croatian expatriate sportspeople in Iraq
Croatian expatriate sportspeople in Oman
Croatian expatriate sportspeople in Uzbekistan